Hillman was a British automobile marque created by the Hillman-Coatalen Company, founded in 1907, renamed the Hillman Motor Car Company in 1910.  The company was based in Ryton-on-Dunsmore, near Coventry, England.  Before 1907 the company had built bicycles. Newly under the control of the Rootes brothers, the Hillman company was acquired by Humber in 1928. Hillman was used as the small car marque of Humber Limited from 1931, but until 1937 Hillman did continue to sell large cars. The Rootes brothers reached a sixty per cent holding of Humber in 1932 which they retained until 1967, when Chrysler bought Rootes and bought out the other forty per cent of shareholders in Humber.  The marque continued to be used under Chrysler until 1976.

History

Origins

In 1857 Josiah Turner and James Starley formed the Coventry Sewing Machine Company, and recruited skilled engineers from the London area to join them, one of whom was William Hillman. In 1869 the firm changed its name to the Coventry Machinists Company, and like many other manufacturers in the area embarked on producing velocipedes. In 1870 Hillman and Starley patented a new bicycle called the "Ariel" and by 1885 Hillman was a partner of the bicycle manufacturer Hillman Herbert and Cooper, producing a bicycle called the Kangaroo. Hillman's new company soon established itself, and before the turn of the 20th century, Hillman was a millionaire. With wealth came the means to fulfil Hillman's next ambition, to become a car producer. Hillman had moved into Abingdon House in Stoke Aldermoor near Coventry and decided that a sensible plan would be to set up a car factory in its grounds. In 1907 Hillman-Coatalen was founded by William Hillman with the Breton Louis Coatalen as designer and chief engineer. They launched the 24HP Hillman-Coatalen, which was entered into that year's Tourist Trophy. The car was put out of the race by a crash, but it had made a splash. Coatalen left in 1909 to join Sunbeam and the company was re-registered as the Hillman Motor Car Company in 1910.

The first cars were large, featuring a 9.76-litre 6-cylinder engine or a 6.4-litre four. A smaller car, the 9 hp of 1913 with a 1357 cc side-valve four-cylinder engine, was the first to sell in significant numbers and was re-introduced after the First World War as the 11 hp, having grown to 1600 cc. The big seller was the 14 hp introduced in 1925, and the only model made until 1928. Following the fashion of the time a Straight Eight of 2.6 litres and Hillman's first use of overhead valves came in 1928 but soon gained a reputation for big-end problems.

Alumni
William Hillman had six daughters and no sons. A daughter married John Black, managing director of Hillman, who left at the time of the Rootes takeover and went to Standard Motor Co. Another daughter married Maurice Wilks who left Hillman in the same period and eventually went to Rover Company.

Hillman brand

Rootes Group

In 1928, Hillman fell under the control of the Rootes brothers and then merged with Humber. The Rootes brothers obtained further backing from Prudential Assurance during 1931 and brought their holding up to 60 per cent of Humber. Then, in stages, Hillman was switched to manufacturing small cars and became the best known brand within the Rootes empire alongside Humber, Sunbeam and, in the Rootes Group's final decade, Singer.

The 1930s saw a return to side valves with a 6-cylinder Wizard first produced in April 1931 and, in 1932, inspired by the Rootes brothers, the first car to carry the Minx name. This had a 1185 cc four-cylinder engine and went through a series of updates in body style and construction until the end of the Second World War. In 1934 the Hillman Wizard "65" and "75" were replaced by the 2110 cc Hillman "16 hp" and 2810cc "20/70", which lasted until 1936 when a new body design in the form of the 2576 cc Hillman "Sixteen" and the 3181 cc  "Hawk" and "80", all with side valve straight-six engines, were introduced. These later cars were also sold as Humbers.

After the war, the Minx was reintroduced with the same 1185 cc engine. It went through a series of models given Phase numbers and the Phase VIII of 1955 saw the arrival of an overhead-valve engine 1390cc, the Mk 8. The later 1956 Two Tone version of this model, the Mark 8A, was called the "Gay Look" and led to the advertising slogan "As Gay as a Mardi Gras". A smaller car, the Husky with van like body and using the old side-valve engine, was also new for 1954. The floor pan of this model was later to form the basis for the Sunbeam Alpine, Sunbeam also being part of the Rootes empire. A complete departure in 1963 was the Hillman Imp using a Coventry Climax all alloy, 875 cc rear engine and built in a brand new factory in Linwood, Scotland. The location was chosen under government influence to bring employment to a depressed area. A fastback version, the Californian, and an estate re-using the Husky name were also made. A new car called the Hunter was introduced in 1966 with, in 1967, a smaller-engined standard version using the old Minx name. These are frequently given their factory code of "Arrow", but this name was never officially used in marketing.

Chrysler
Chrysler had assumed complete control of Rootes by 1967, and the first new Hillman model whose development was financed by the American giant was the Avenger of 1970.

Peugeot
The Avenger and Hunter ranges were rebadged as Chryslers until 1979, when Chrysler sold its European division to Peugeot. At this point, Hunter production was shelved and the Avenger was rebadged as a Talbot until it was finally withdrawn from sale at the end of 1981.

Hillman's Ryton factory, which had assembled various Peugeot models for the European market, closed in 2007. The French company still owns the rights to the Hillman name.

Car models

Cars introduced after 1930 were a new range to the specification of the Rootes brothers
 Hillman 40 hp 1907–1911 (also known as 40/60)
 Hillman 25 hp 1909–1913 (also known as 25/40)
 Hillman 12/15 1908–1913
 Hillman 9 hp 1913–1915
 Hillman 10 hp 1910
 Hillman 13/25 1914
 Hillman 11 1915–1926
 Hillman 10 hp Super Sports 1920–1922
 Hillman 14 1925–1930
Cars to the specification of the Rootes brothers
 Hillman 20 range:
Straight Eight 1929
Vortic 1930
Wizard 75 1931–1933
Twenty 70 1934–1935
Hawk 1936–1937
Long wheelbase Hillman 20s:
Seven-Seater LWB 1934–1935
Hillman 80 LWB 1936–1938
 Hillman 16 range:
Wizard 65 1931–1933
Sixteen 1934–1937
 Hillman Minx 1932–1970 (various models)
 Hillman 14 1938–1940
 Hillman Husky 1954–1963
 Hillman Super Minx 1961–1967
 Hillman Imp 1963–1976
 Hillman Gazelle 1966–1967 (Australia)
 Hillman Hunter 1966–1979
 Hillman Arrow 1967–1968 (Australia)
 Hillman Avenger 1970–1981
 Hillman Hustler 1971–1972 (Australia)

See also
 List of car manufacturers of the United Kingdom

References

External links

 Hillman Sixteen/Hawk/80 website

Hillman
Defunct motor vehicle manufacturers of the United Kingdom
Rootes Group
Coventry motor companies
Vehicle manufacturing companies established in 1907
Vehicle manufacturing companies disestablished in 1931
British companies established in 1907
British companies disestablished in 1931
Car brands
British brands
Chrysler